The White House Task Force to Protect Students from Sexual Assault was formed on January 22, 2014, after President Barack Obama directed the Office of the Vice President of the United States and the White House Council on Women and Girls to "strengthen and address compliance issues and provide institutions with additional tools to respond to and address rape and sexual assault". The Task Force is part of a wider federal move to bring awareness to sexual violence on American campuses, which also included the Office for Civil Rights release of a list of American higher education institutions with open Title IX sexual violence investigations and the It's On Us public awareness campaign. The co-chairs of the Task Force are Vice President Joe Biden and Senior Advisor to the President Valerie Jarrett.

Background and history

While formed through an official government memorandum on January 22, 2014, the White House Task Force to Protect Students from Sexual Assault exists as part of a lineage of government interventions against sexual violence, notably the White House Council on Women and Girls formed in 2009 and the Violence Against Women Act first drafted by Biden when he was a senator in 1994. Simultaneously, activists within The New Campus Anti-Rape Movement have pushed for legislative changes in the ways the U.S. government enforces regulations, as demonstrated in the collaborations between nationally recognized activists and U.S. senators.

Data published in a 2014 government report on sexual assault in American colleges and universities reflects the numbers and backgrounds of college students who have experienced sexual assault.

A report published in January 2015 by the Bureau of Justice Statistics, the result of a nine-school pilot to conduct a campus study on "school-level data on sexual victimization of undergraduate students," found that 
 Younger students (between 18–22 years of age) experienced sexual victimization at a rate higher than those 23 or older
 Non-heterosexual students are more likely to be victimized than heterosexual students at the nine schools surveyed
 On average, the rate of victimization for completed sexual assault among undergraduate females was 176 per 1,000 
 On average, the rate of victimization for rape among undergraduate females was 54 per 1,000

Responsibilities
The Task Force was created to protect students from sexual assault, to help improve the safety of American college and university campuses, and to help American colleges and universities to "meet their obligations" and be in compliance with federal regulations in this area.

By 2016, the Task Force, in collaboration with federal agencies, produced training, messaging and guidance materials "concerning sexual assault in educational spaces," which can be found in a public-facing Resource Guide.

Members
Obama specified in his official memorandum those people who are to be members of the Task Force.  Those individuals include Joe Biden or his designee; Valerie Jarrett or her designee; the Attorney General; the Secretary of the Interior; the Secretary of Health and Human Services; the Secretary of Education; the Director of the Office of Science and Technology Policy; the Director of the Domestic Policy Council; the Cabinet Secretary; and agency or office heads as may be designated by the co-chairs.

Joe Biden
Joe Biden's goal from the campaign is to prevent sexual assault. He also strives to create less discrepancies with sexual assault, calling for a future in which a victim of sexual assault does not need to question his or her doing. Biden issued federal guidelines while presenting a speech at the University of New Hampshire. He stated that, "No means no, if you're drunk or you're sober. No means no if you're in bed, in a dorm or on the street. No means no even if you said yes at first and you changed your mind. No means no."

Biden has taken a stance on sexual assault, making speeches to students, asking them to stand against assault. Biden stated to the victim of sexual assault at Stanford University, "you did it... in the hope that your strength might prevent this crime from happening to someone else. Your bravery is breathtaking."

See also
Post-assault treatment of sexual assault victims
Women's rights in 2014

References

External links
 Official memorandum establishing the Task Force
 Valerie Jarrett's article regarding Task Force establishment

2014 establishments in the United States
United States Presidential Task Forces
Sexual Assault
Campus sexual assault
Sex crimes in the United States
Victims' rights
Presidency of Barack Obama